Anis Halloway is a Sierra Leonian singer, songwriter, creative director, sound designer, music producer, and voice-over artist.  He is a resident of Lagos, Nigeria.

Halloway was previously signed to the GDM Records record label and worked as an actor on Tinsel and Desperate Housewives Africa. He had a promo single released called "Eyes on Me". His album Going On was reviewed on BBC Radio 3's Africa on Your Street website.

Halloway moved to Nigeria while participating as a contestant on the MTN Project Fame West Africa. He went on to work as a presenter and voice-over artist at Nigezie TV. He also hosted the maiden edition of Nigerian Idol and worked as music producer for African Media Production Network (AMPN)'s Star The Winner is.  Halloway is a talent scout and selector for The Voice Nigeria.

Halloway has worked with Sam Kargbo Productions as an artist, music producer and creative director and is Technical and creative director and Sound Designer at 76 media.
He’s also currently exercising his directorial prowess on content for Africa Magic and his own media company Blink Africa Ltd.

References

External links
BBC Radio 3 Africa on Your Street CD reviews

Year of birth missing (living people)
Living people
Residents of Lagos
Sierra Leonean male singers